Manchild or man child may refer to:

Music
 Man-Child, a 1975 album by Herbie Hancock
Man-Child (musical), a 1971 Australian musical by Chris Neal
 Manchild (band), an American 1970s soul band from Indianapolis, Indiana
 Manchild (rapper), American Christian rapper
Manchild, a 1999 album by Shyheim
 "Manchild" (song) by Neneh Cherry, 1989
"Manchild", a song by Eels from the 1996 album Beautiful Freak

Other uses
 Manchild (TV series), a BBC TV series
 "The Man Child", a short story by James Baldwin
 Manchild: The Schea Cotton Story, a documentary on American basketball player Schea Cotton

See also
 Adult child (disambiguation)
 Kidult, an gender neutral portmanteau coinages refer to adults with interests traditionally seen as suitable for children
 Puer aeternus (Latin for "eternal boy"), a child-god who is forever young in mythology